Microrhopala excavata is a species of leaf beetle in the family Chrysomelidae. It is found in North America.

Subspecies
These two subspecies belong to the species Microrhopala excavata:
 Microrhopala excavata cyanea (Say, 1824)
 Microrhopala excavata excavata (Olivier, 1808)

References

Further reading

External links

 

Cassidinae
Articles created by Qbugbot
Beetles described in 1808